Ulla Gunilla Lindström, née Wohlin (15 September 1909 in Stockholm – 10 July 1999), was a Swedish journalist and politician (Social Democrat). She was Minister of Family, Consumer, Aid and Refugee Affairs from 1954 to 1966. She was also the first woman in Sweden to be acting Prime Minister (1958).

Biography
Ulla Lindström was born in Stockholm to right-wing Nils Wohlin, the Minister of Trade in 1923–1924 and Minister of Finance in 1928–1929, and piano teacher Gunilla Wohlin. Her parents divorced when she was ten, and she grew up with her mother. She graduated as a teacher in 1933, and worked as the editor of the newspapers  from 1934 to 1946, and Vår bostad from 1937 to 1946. She became a social democrat as a student, and was the chairperson of the social democratic women's club Allmänna kvinnoklubben in Stockholm from 1935 to 1945 and an elected member of the Stockholm city council from 1942 to 1945. She was a member of parliament from 1946 to 1970 and a consultant in the Trade department from 1947 to 1954. Lindström was a delegate of the United Nations General Assembly 1947–1966, and chairperson of Rädda Barnen 1971–1989.

Lindström served as Minister of Family, Consumption, Aid and Refugee Affairs from 1954 to 1966. Her appointment was encouraged by the Social Democratic Women, who demanded female representation on all levels, a demand which Tage Erlander wished to fulfill. During her tenure, she was the only woman in the government, and unusual as a female minister not only in Sweden but also internationally. Her appointment was very popular among women, and she continued being popular among women during her tenure. Personally, she believed that she was not the only woman who deserved a place in the government, and she was disappointed that she continued to be the only one of her gender in the government during her tenure, despite the fact that she repeatedly suggested that Inga Thorsson deserved to receive a ministerial post.

Lindström was controversial and caused great attention in the media when she refused to curtsey to Queen Elizabeth II in 1956: this was reported in international press, and regarded as an insult by royalists, and as a demonstration of equality in the eyes of others. In 1958, she served as acting Prime minister of Sweden during the summer break of the Prime Minister, becoming the first person of her gender to serve in that function. She resigned under protest in 1966 when the government did not fulfil their promise of an increased aid.

She was awarded the Illis quorum in 1978.

References

Notes

Sources

External links
Women in Power 1940

Further reading
 

20th-century Swedish journalists
20th-century Swedish women politicians
1909 births
1999 deaths
Swedish Ministers for International Development Cooperation
Swedish Social Democratic Party politicians
Swedish women journalists
Women government ministers of Sweden
Women members of the Riksdag
Recipients of the Illis quorum
Swedish Ministers for Gender Equality